During the 2002–03 Italian football season, Torino Calcio competed in the Serie A.

Season summary
Torino finished the season in 18th position in the Serie A table, meaning that they were relegated back to the Serie B after two seasons. In other competitions, Torino reached the second round of the Coppa Italia.

Marco Ferrante was the top scorer for Torino with 8 goals in all competitions.

Kit
Torino's kit was manufactured by Japanese sports retailer Asics and sponsored by Ixfin.

Squad

Competitions

Serie A

References 

Torino F.C. seasons
Torino